Abu Anas al-Shami, was a senior leader in the Jama'at al-Tawhid wal Jihad militant group during the Iraq War, He was a Palestinian from Tulkarm city in the West Bank, born in Kuwait in 1969.

According to the late ISIS cleric Turki al-Binali, he mentored Abu Muhammad al-Adnani, the late spokesperson of the Islamic State of Iraq and the Levant.

History
Abu Anas Al Shami was a Palestinian cleric, teacher, writer, and jihadist born in Kuwait. It has been said that "from the age of 14, Abu Anas had mastered the complexities of the Arabic language, and a year later memorized the entire Quran." Originally from the Palestinian West Bank town of Yabroud, Abu Anas obtained an Islamic studies degree at the Islamic University of Madinah in Saudi Arabia.

In the mid-1990s he went to Bosnia-Herzegovina to teach Islam in towns and refugee camps. He then returned to Jordan and became a preacher in the neighborhood of Sweileh. In the late 1990s, the Jordanian officials shut down an Islamic center that al-Shami had established in Amman on the grounds that it was promoting an extreme interpretation of Islam.

Iraq
In 2003, al-Shami joined al-Tawheed wal-Jihad leader Abu Musab al-Zarqawi in north-eastern Iraq. He was appointed to the advisory council of the group and soon became Zarqawi's second in command. He was both spiritual advisor to the group and directed many of its attacks and battles against American and Iraqi forces. In a letter he wrote that his 300 mujaheddin had fought-off over 2,000 U.S. Marines in the First Battle of Fallujah.

In one tape in August 2004, a speaker identified as Abu Anas al-Shami (second man of Zarqawi and leader of Jama'at al-Tawhid wal-Jihad made up mostly by foreigners) said the militants planned to kill Iraqi prime minister Ayad Allawi, soldiers and police officers.

Death
Abu Anas al-Shami was killed by an American missilestrike against his car on 16 September 2004 near Abu Ghraib, when he had been sent by Zarqawi to the Sadr City area of Baghdad. A eulogy to him was written by Zarqawi's first spiritual mentor, Abu Muhammad al-Maqdisi, and appeared on the Tawhed website which is run by Maqdisi's organisation on behalf of al-Qaeda.

References

2004 deaths
1969 births
Deaths by American airstrikes
Palestinian al-Qaeda members
Islamic University of Madinah alumni
Salafi jihadists
People from Tulkarm